Lee Desmond (born 22 January 1995) is an Irish professional footballer who plays as a centre back or centre midfielder for USL Championship club Sacramento Republic.

Career

Early career
Desmond played youth football with Malahide United, Crumlin United and Cherry Orchard before being picked up by English Premier League side Newcastle United, where he played in their youth and reserve teams. He was released by Newcastle at the end of their 2012–2013 season despite playing regularly for their development squad. Desmond joined Shelbourne in July 2013 after playing against them in a friendly while on trial with Ipswich Town and impressed Shels manager Johnny McDonnell enough for him to offer the youngster the chance to join the club. He played for the Shelbourne under 19 team for the 2013–2014 season before signing for the Shels first team in November 2013.

Shelbourne
After standing out for the club's under 19 side, he was called up to the first team for the 2014 season as they aimed to win promotion to the League of Ireland Premier Division. Desmond became a mainstay in the first team, playing at both left-back and centre-back throughout the season. He scored his first goal in senior football on 23 May 2014 in a 1–1 draw away to Finn Harps. The season ended in disappointment however as Shels failed to earn promotion as they lost out to Galway in the Semi-final of the Promotion Playoffs, although Desmond did win the Shelbourne Players' Player of the Year award after a very impressive first season in senior football.

St Patrick's Athletic
Desmond's impressive season with Shelbourne attracted interest from Shels' Dublin rivals and FAI Cup holders, St Patrick's Athletic from the League of Ireland Premier Division. He was announced to have signed for the Saints on 11 November 2014, alongside Jason McGuinness and Ciarán Kilduff. Desmond featured throughout the season for Pats, mainly at centre-back but also at left or right back in the absence of Ian Bermingham or Ger O'Brien. He started in many important games including playing in both legs of their UEFA Europa League games against Skonto Riga of Latvia. On 19 September 2015 he started at left back in the 2015 League of Ireland Cup Final against Galway United and won his first winners medal at senior level, as the Saints won on penalties after a 0–0 draw. At the club's end of season awards he was voted as Young Player of the Year by the St Pat's supporters following a brilliant debut season.

Desmond's second season at Pat's proved to be a more difficult one for him, as he lost his place in the centre of defence following some errors resulting in goals for the opposition. Midway through the season, he was deployed by Liam Buckley as a defensive midfielder following poor performances by various regular choice midfielders and Desmond impressed supporters in games this role including a 4–1 win over Limerick in the 2016 League Cup Final to help the Saints retain the trophy.

The 2017 season saw Pat's involved in a relegation battle, with the team bottom of the table and struggling mid-season. Having played many games as a holding midfielder in the first half of the season, Desmond was returned to centre back and formed an excellent defensive partnership with mid-season signing Jordi Balk. The team's form also picked up in the second half of the season as they managed to finish in 8th position with Desmond contributing heavily, playing in all but one of the club's 33 league games.

The 2018 season saw Desmond voted Player of the Year by the club's supporters.

Desmond made his 200th appearance for the club on 23 April 2021 in a 2–0 win over Finn Harps at Finn Park. On 28 November 2021 Desmond played the full 120 minutes of the 2021 FAI Cup Final, beating rivals Bohemians 4–3 on penalties following a 1–1 draw after extra time in front of a record FAI Cup Final crowd of 37,126 at the Aviva Stadium. This would prove to be his last game for the club as he departed at the end of the season.

Sacramento Republic
On 23 December 2021, Desmond signed for USL Championship club Sacramento Republic on a two-year deal. Desmond made his debut for the club on 13 March 2022 in a 3–1 win over El Paso Locomotive at Heart Health Park. Desmond featured in every round of the club's run to the final of the U.S. Open Cup, including wins over Major League Soccer sides San Jose Earthquakes, Sporting Kansas City and LA Galaxy. On 7 September 2022, Desmond played in the 2022 U.S. Open Cup Final as his side were defeated 3–0 by Orlando City in front of a sold out crowd of over 25,000 at the Exploria Stadium in Florida.

International career
Desmond was called up to the Republic of Ireland under-21s shortly after he signed for St Patrick's Athletic alongside fellow centre back Sean Hoare. Desmond, along with fellow St Patrick's Athletic teammates Conor Kearns and Shane Griffin, was called up to train with the Republic of Ireland senior squad on 31 August 2020, in what was new manager Stephen Kenny's first training session with the squad.

Career statistics

Honours
St Patrick's Athletic
FAI Cup (1): 2021
League of Ireland Cup (2): 2015, 2016

Individual
St Patrick's Athletic Player of the Year: 2018
St Patrick's Athletic Young Player of the Year: 2015
Shelbourne Players' Player of the Year: 2014

References

External links

1995 births
Living people
People from Donaghmede
Association footballers from Dublin (city)
Republic of Ireland association footballers
Republic of Ireland under-21 international footballers
Newcastle United F.C. players
Shelbourne F.C. players
St Patrick's Athletic F.C. players
League of Ireland players
Association football defenders
Republic of Ireland youth international footballers
Cherry Orchard F.C. players
Crumlin United F.C. players
Malahide United F.C. players
Republic of Ireland expatriate association footballers
Irish expatriate sportspeople in England
Sacramento Republic FC players
Expatriate footballers in England
Expatriate soccer players in the United States
Irish expatriate sportspeople in the United States